Ilanga polita is a species of sea snail, a marine gastropod mollusk in the family Solariellidae.

Description
The size of the shell attains 5 mm.

Distribution
This marine species occurs off Transkei, South Africa

References

External links
 To World Register of Marine Species

polita
Gastropods described in 1987